Thomas Grekos (born 18 April 1991) is a Greek professional footballer who plays as a right back.

Career
Grekos made his debut with Aris on 16 May 2010 in a match against Olympiakos.
He also played for Makedonikos , Zakynthos and Ethnikos Neo Agioneri.

References

External links
 
Myplayer.gr Profile

1991 births
Living people
Greek footballers
Footballers from Thessaloniki
Super League Greece players
Aris Thessaloniki F.C. players
A.P.S. Zakynthos players
Paniliakos F.C. players
Panelefsiniakos F.C. players
Irodotos FC players
Association football fullbacks